Shaam often refers to the Greater Syria (region), now most often called "the Levant".

Shaam may also refer to:

Places 

Bilad al-Shaam, a former province corresponding to the Levant
 Harrat al-Shaam, a volcanic field in the Middle East

Television 
 Shaam Dhaley, 2016 Pakistani television series

People 

Shaam Ibrahim (born 1977), Indian actor and model
 Mahmood Shaam (born 1940), Pakistani journalist and poet

See also 
 Sham (disambiguation)
 Syria (disambiguation)